Alan James Fitzmorris (born March 21, 1946), is a former professional baseball player who pitched in the Major Leagues from 1969 to 1978.

Fitzmorris signed as a non-drafted free agent with the Chicago White Sox in 1966. In October 1968, he left the Sox as the 40th overall pick by the Kansas City Royals. Fitzmorris won a career high 16 games for the Royals in 1975. He stayed with the Royals until 1976.  In November of that year, the Toronto Blue Jays picked him up as the 13th pick overall. He was traded by the Jays to the Cleveland Indians in exchange for Alan Ashby and Doug Howard. The Indians released him in 1978, and before a month was out he was signed by the California Angels. Granted free agency in November of that year, he signed on with the San Diego Padres in February 1979.

Pitching Stats
 77 Wins
 59 Losses
 288 Games
 159 Games Started
 36 Complete Games
 11 Shutouts
 49 Games Finished
 7 Saves
 1,277 Innings pitched
 1,284 Hits Allowed
 573 Runs Allowed
 518 Earned Runs Allowed
 83 Home Runs Allowed
 433 Walks Allowed
 458 Strikeouts
 11 Hit Batsmen
 62 Wild Pitches
 5,385 Batters Faced
 47 Intentional Walks
 3 Balks
 3.65 ERA
 1.345 WHIP

Sources

1946 births
Living people
Appleton Foxes players
Baseball players from Buffalo, New York
California Angels players
Cleveland Indians players
Clinton C-Sox players
Florida Instructional League White Sox players
Florida Rookie League White Sox players
Fox Cities Foxes players
Hawaii Islanders players
Kansas City Royals players
Lynchburg White Sox players
Major League Baseball pitchers
Omaha Royals players
Salt Lake City Gulls players
Tiburones de La Guaira players
American expatriate baseball players in Venezuela